Dr. Miroslav Feldman (28 December 189930 May 1976) was a Croatian-Jewish poet and writer. Feldman was born in Virovitica on 28 December 1899. He studied medicine in Zagreb and Vienna. After graduation, he returned to Croatia and worked as a physician in Virovitica, Osijek, Pakrac, Sarajevo and Zagreb. During World War II he joined the Partisans, where he helped organize the medical corps.

Feldman was the president of the Croatian and Yugoslav PEN. He began his career as a poet, but he was most notable as a drama writer. Feldman wrote a psychological drama with elements of the grotesque, and works with a strong social critique, in which he satirically speaks of occurrence in the province and life of the higher society.

Feldman died in Zagreb on 30 May 1976 and was buried at the Mirogoj Cemetery.

Works
 "Arhipelag snova"
 "Vožnja"
 "Zec"
 "Profesor Žič"
 "U pozadini"
 "Iz mraka"

References

Bibliography

 
 

1899 births
1976 deaths
People from Virovitica
Burials at Mirogoj Cemetery
Croatian Jews
Austro-Hungarian Jews
Croatian Austro-Hungarians
Croatian male poets
Jewish poets
Jewish Austrian writers
Yugoslav Partisans members
Croatian people of World War II
Vladimir Nazor Award winners
20th-century Croatian poets
20th-century male writers
Jews in the Yugoslav Partisans